Linden High School, a grade 9-12 high school in the Linden Community School District, is located west of Linden, Michigan.

Demographics
The demographic breakdown of the 942 students enrolled in 2015-16 was:
Male - 53.8%
Female - 46.2%
Native American/Alaskan - 0.2%
Asian/Pacific islanders - 0.5%
Black - 0.3%
Hispanic - 3.1%
White - 94.8%
Multiracial - 1.1%
18.8% of the students were eligible for free or reduced-cost lunch.

Athletics
The Linden Eagles compete in the Flint Metro League. The school colors are red, black and white. The following Michigan High School Athletic Association (MHSAA) sports are offered:

Baseball (boys)
Basketball (girls and boys)
Bowling (girls and boys)
Competitive cheer (girls)
Cross country (girls and boys)
Boys state championship - 2008
Football (boys)
Golf (girls and boys)
Gymnastics (girls)
Ice hockey (boys)
Lacrosse (girls and boys)
Skiing (girls and boys)
Soccer (girls and boys)
Softball (girls)
Swim and dive (girls)l
Track and field (girls and boys)
Volleyball (girls)
Wrestling (boys)

Notable alumni
Mike Mueller (Class of 1992), member of the Michigan House of Representatives (2019–present)

References

External links

District website

Public high schools in Michigan
Educational institutions established in 1896
Schools in Genesee County, Michigan
1896 establishments in Michigan